Clock Tower is a structure located at the centre of Anantapur in the Indian state of Andhra Pradesh. It was built in memory of martyrs of the Indian freedom movement. In 1945, under the leadership of M. Ramachandra Naidu, the district judge and other individuals took initiative to construct the structure. Its radius is 15 feet which signifies the date 15th. It has 8 faces which signifies the eighth month of the year i.e. August. The height of the Clock Tower is 47 feet which signifies the year 1947.

References 

Clock towers in India
Buildings and structures in Anantapur district